Jean Marc Vantelli Chaput (October 26, 1910 – July 20, 1974) was a Canadian politician who represented the electoral district of Nipissing in the Legislative Assembly of Ontario from 1954 to 1959. He was a member of the Progressive Conservative Party of Ontario.

Chaput was born in Mattawa, Ontario, to Frederic Chaput and Hermanie Nadon. Prior to being elected, Chaput owned and operated a hotel in North Bay.

External links
 

1910 births
1977 deaths
Franco-Ontarian people
People from Mattawa, Ontario
Progressive Conservative Party of Ontario MPPs